Jem Ward (26 December 1800 – 3 April 1884) was an English bare-knuckle boxer.  "A fine fighter and powerfully built man", he was the English champion from 1825 until 1831. He became known for being one of the first boxers to be sanctioned for deliberately losing a fight. During his fighting career he was nicknamed "The Black Diamond".  In his retirement he became a successful artist.

Boxing career 

Ward first became a professional boxer in 1815, at 15 years of age.  He was 5 ft 11 inches (1.80 m) tall, and weighed 12 stone (76 kg). His first fight was victorious against George Robinson and from this point he never lost a match, until he lost to Bill Abbott in 1822. This was the controversial bout that wrecked Ward's early professional career. He was heard to call to his opponent "Now, Bill, look sharp, hit me and I’ll go down." He was promptly hit and fell to the ground.  Abbott was considered to be an inferior boxer to Ward, and suspicions were immediately aroused.  The Pugilistic Society, the body which then governed boxing and enforced the London Prize Ring rules, held an inquiry. Eventually after confessing he had received a £100 bribe to lose, Ward was banned from fighting in any contest governed by the Society.  In this era boxing was an object of heavy betting, by members of all strata of society, including the sons of King George III.

The incident has left Ward's reputation with a lasting stigma and still today causes some to be of the opinion that Ward should not have been admitted to the Boxing hall of Fame 120 years after his death. Ward was the elder brother of the boxer Nick Ward, who also had a reputation for using unfair tactics.  Nick Ward, however, did not achieve the same success as his brother in the ring.

Deprived of his living Ward was reduced to travelling the country fighting under assumed names at fairs or in any chance ungoverned brawl where he could possibly pick up a prize.  Once early in 1823 when attending a bout as a spectator, he was called upon to enter the ring, when the planned fight ended prematurely, and someone was needed to provide entertainment to keep the crowd present and spending money.  He fought Ned Baldwin and defeated him, but the match was void due to his ban.Later in 1823, the Pugilistic Society decided to re-allow him to enter their fights.

After his reinstatement, he lost his first fight to Josh Hudson. In 1825, anxious for publicity and thus money, he challenged and fought the reigning champion Tom Cannon. This proved to be the very high-profile match Ward needed, with Cannon seconded by two previous champions Tom Spring and Tom Cribb, names guaranteed to draw the crowds.  The match took place on 19 July 1825 at Stanfield Park on a very hot day with the temperature reputedly over 90 degrees Fahrenheit. It took Ward just over 10 minutes to dispatch Cannon and become the new English champion.

Following the victory Ward led a life of ease and dissipation for two years, having bought a public house.  In 1827 he was finally forced by public opinion to return to the ring, and accept a challenge from Peter Crawley.  He was defeated by Crawley but quickly reclaimed the title when Crawley retired immediately after their match.  Ward's last match was in 1831. On 12 July, he fought his last fight against the Irish champion, Simon Byrne. After an hour and seventeen minutes Ward was victorious, and retained his title until his retirement in 1831.

His 1831 retirement was forced. Ward had  received criticism for refusing to face the younger challenger, James Burke, and rather than fight he retired and relinquished his title.  However he did not relinquish to Burke his title, when pressed he agreed to pass it to the victor of Burke's match against his last adversary  Simon Byrne in 1833.  However, Ward refused to hand over the belt when Burke beat Byrne who Ward supported.  Byrne, who had been knocked unconscious died three days later after the fight, Burke was tried and acquitted of his murder, but Ward still refused to part with the championship belt.He finally handed the belt over to William ‘Bendigo’ Thompson at the Queen’s Theatre in Liverpool following the latter's defeat of Burke in 1839.

Retirement 

In retirement he kept the "York Hotel" in Liverpool, where he was taught to paint by his great friend the artist William Daniels. He became an accomplished and proficient artist exhibiting his work in London and Liverpool.  As a musician he played both the violin and flute, and sang in concerts. He also taught the boxing arts to students, one of whom, Tom King, went on to defeat the legendary Jem Mace to become champion in 1863.  Ward died in 1884 at his home in London.  He was elected to the International Boxing Hall of Fame in 1995. He is buried in Nunhead Cemetery, London.

See also
List of bare-knuckle boxers

References

External links
Chapter on Ward in Pugilistica, the History of British Boxing, volume 2
qualitycards famous prizefighters

Bare-knuckle boxers
English male boxers
1800 births
1884 deaths